The European theatre of World War II was one of the two main theatres of combat during World War II. It saw heavy fighting across Europe for almost six years, starting with Germany's invasion of Poland on 1 September 1939 and ending with the Western Allies conquering most of Western Europe, the Soviet Union conquering most of Eastern Europe and Germany's unconditional surrender on 8 May 1945 although fighting continued elsewhere in Europe until 25 May. On 5 June 1945, the Berlin Declaration proclaiming the unconditional surrender of Germany to the four victorious powers was signed. The Allied powers fought the Axis powers on two major fronts (Eastern Front and Western Front) as well as in a strategic bombing offensive and in the adjoining Mediterranean and Middle East theatre.

Preceding events

Germany was defeated in World War I, and the Treaty of Versailles placed punitive conditions on the country, including significant financial reparations, the loss of territory (some only temporarily), war guilt, military weakening and limitation, and economic weakening. Germany was humiliated in front of the world and had to pay very large war reparations. Many Germans blamed their country's post-war economic collapse on the treaty's conditions and these resentments contributed to the political instability which made it possible for Adolf Hitler and his Nazi Party to come to power.

After Hitler took Germany out of the League of Nations, Mussolini of Fascist Italy and Hitler formed the Rome-Berlin axis, under a treaty known as the Pact of Steel. Later, the Empire of Japan, under the government of Hideki Tojo, would also join as an Axis power. Japan and Germany had already signed the Anti-Comintern Pact in 1936, to counter the perceived threat of the communism of the Soviet Union. Other smaller powers also later joined the Axis throughout the war.

Outbreak of war in Europe

Germany and the Soviet Union were sworn enemies, but following the Munich Agreement, which effectively handed over Czechoslovakia (a French and Soviet ally, and the only remaining presidential democracy in Central Europe) to Germany, political realities allowed the Soviet Union to sign a non-aggression pact (the Molotov–Ribbentrop Pact) including a secret clause partitioning Poland, Lithuania, Latvia, Estonia and Finland between the two spheres of influence.

Full-scale war in Europe began at dawn on 1 September 1939, when Germany used so-called Blitzkrieg tactics and military strength to invade Poland, to which both the United Kingdom and France had pledged protection and independence guarantees. On 3 September 1939, Britain and France declared war on Germany, and other allies soon followed. The British Expeditionary Force was sent to France; however, neither French nor British troops gave any significant assistance to the Poles during the entire invasion, and the German–French border, excepting the Saar Offensive, remained mostly calm. This period of the war is commonly known as the Phoney War.

On 17 September the Soviet forces joined the invasion of Poland, although remaining neutral with respect to Western powers. The Polish government evacuated the country for Romania. Poland fell within five weeks, with its last large operational units surrendering on 6 October after the Battle of Kock. As the Polish September Campaign ended, Hitler offered Britain and France peace on the basis of recognition of German European continental dominance. On 12 October the United Kingdom formally refused.

Despite the quick campaign in the east, along the Franco-German frontier the war settled into a quiet period. This relatively non-confrontational and mostly non-fighting period between the major powers lasted until Germany launched an invasion on 10 May 1940.

Germany and the USSR partition Northern Europe

Several other countries, however, were drawn into the conflict at this time. After 28 September 1939, the Soviet government presented the governments of Estonia, Latvia and Lithuania with ultimatums threatening with military invasion, thus compelling the three small nations to conclude mutual assistance pacts which gave the Soviets the right to establish military bases there. The Soviet Union issued similar demands to Finland in October 1939 but these were rejected, leading to the Soviet invasion of Finland on 30 November, starting the Winter War. 

The Soviet Union did not accomplish its goal of annexing Finland. In the Moscow Peace Treaty of April 1940, Finland ceded 9% of its territory, including parts of Karelia and Salla. The Finns were embittered over having lost more land in the peace than on the battlefields, and over the perceived lack of world sympathy.

In the rest of Scandinavia, Germany invaded Denmark and Norway in April 1940, and in response, Britain occupied the Faroe Islands (a Danish territory) and invaded and occupied Iceland (a sovereign nation with the King of Denmark as its monarch). Sweden was able to remain neutral.

The Baltic Republics were occupied by the Soviet army in June 1940, and formally annexed to the Soviet Union in August 1940.

War comes to the West

On 10 May the Phoney War ended with a sweeping German invasion of the neutral Low Countries of Belgium, the Netherlands, and Luxembourg, and into France bypassing the French fortifications of the Maginot Line along the border with Germany. After overrunning the Netherlands, Belgium, and Luxembourg, Germany turned against France, entering the country through the Ardennes on 13 May—the French had left this area less well defended, believing its terrain to be impassable for tanks and other vehicles. Most Allied forces were in Flanders, anticipating a re-run of the World War I Schlieffen Plan, and were cut off from the French mainland. As a result of this, as well as the superior German communications and tactics, the Battle of France lasted only six weeks; far shorter than what virtually all pre-war Allied thought could have conceived. On 10 June Italy declared war on both France and the United Kingdom but did not gain any significant success in this campaign. The French government fled Paris, and soon, France surrendered on 22 June. In order to further the humiliation of the French people and the country itself, Hitler arranged for the surrender document to be signed in the Forest of Compiègne, in the same railway coach where the German surrender had been signed in 1918. The surrender divided France into two major parts; the northern part under German control, and a southern part under French control, based at Vichy and referred to as Vichy France, a rump state friendly to Germany. Many French soldiers, as well as those of other occupied countries, escaped to Britain. The General de Gaulle proclaimed himself the legitimate leader of Free France and vowed to continue to fight. Following the unexpected swift victory, Hitler promoted 12 generals to the rank of field marshal during the 1940 Field Marshal Ceremony.

Vyacheslav Molotov, the Foreign Policy Minister of the USSR, which was tied with Soviet–German non-aggression treaty, congratulated the Germans: "We hand over the most cordial congratulations by the Soviet government on the occasion of splendid success of German Wehrmacht. Guderian's tanks broke through to the sea near Abbeville, powered by Soviet fuel, the German bombs, that razed Rotterdam to the ground, were filled with Soviet pyroxylin, and bullet cases, which hit the British soldiers retreating from Dunkirk, were cast of Soviet cupronickel alloy..."

Later, on 24 April 1941, the USSR gave full diplomatic recognition to the Vichy government situated in the non-occupied zone in France.

Thus, the Fall of France left Britain and the Commonwealth to stand alone. The British Prime Minister, Neville Chamberlain, resigned during the battle and was replaced by Winston Churchill. Much of Britain's army escaped capture from the northern French port of Dunkirk, where hundreds (if not thousands) of tiny civilian boats were used to ferry troops from the beaches to the waiting warships. There is much debate over whether German Panzer divisions could have defeated these soldiers alone if they had pressed forward since the tank divisions were overextended and would require extensive refitting; in any case, Hitler elected to follow the advice of the leader of German air forces Hermann Göring and allow the Luftwaffe alone to attack the Allied forces until German infantry was able to advance, giving the British a window for the evacuation. Later, many of the evacuated troops would form an important part and the center of the army that landed at Normandy on D-Day.

The British rejected several covert German attempts to negotiate peace. Germany massed their air force in northern German-occupied France to prepare the way for a possible invasion, codenamed Operation Seelöwe ("Sea Lion"), deeming that air superiority was essential for the invasion. The operations of the Luftwaffe against the Royal Air Force became known as the Battle of Britain. Initially, the Luftwaffe concentrated on destroying the RAF on the ground and in the air. They later switched to bombing major and large industrial British cities in the Blitz, in an attempt to draw RAF fighters out and defeat them completely. Neither approach was successful in reducing the RAF to the point where air superiority could be obtained, and plans for an invasion were suspended by September 1940.

During the Blitz, all of Britain's major industrial, cathedral, and political sites were heavily bombed. London suffered particularly, being bombed each night for several months. Other targets included Birmingham and Coventry, and strategically important cities, such as the naval base at Plymouth and the port of Kingston upon Hull. With no land forces in direct conflict in Europe, the war in the air attracted worldwide attention even as sea units fought the Battle of the Atlantic and a number of British commando raids hit targets in occupied Europe. Churchill famously said of the RAF personnel who fought in the battle: "Never in the field of human conflict was so much owed by so many to so few".

Air war

The air war in the European theatre commenced in 1939.

Pre-war expectations that "The bomber will always get through" assumed that waves of bombers hitting enemy cities would cause mass panic and the rapid collapse of the enemy. As a result, the Royal Air Force had built up a large strategic bomber force. By way of contrast, Nazi German air force doctrine was almost totally dedicated to supporting the army. Therefore, German bombers were smaller than their British equivalents, and Germany never developed a fully successful heavy bomber equivalent to the British Avro Lancaster or American Boeing B-17 Flying Fortress, with only the similarly sized Heinkel He 177A placed into production and made operational for such duties with the Luftwaffe in the later war years.

Initial German bomber attacks against the UK were targeted at the RAF's airfields in the Battle of Britain; from 7 September 1940 until 10 May 1941 the targets were British towns and cities in "The Blitz".

Following the abandonment of any idea of invasion of the UK, most of the strength of the Luftwaffe was diverted to the war against the Soviet Union leaving German cities vulnerable to British and later American air bombings. Great Britain was used by the U.S and other Allied forces as a base from which to begin the D-Day landings in June 1944 and the liberation of Nazi-occupied Western Europe. Nevertheless, German raids continued on British cities albeit on a smaller and less destructive scale for the rest of the war, and later the V1 Flying Bomb and V-2 ballistic missiles were both used against Britain. However, the balance of bomb tonnage being dropped shifted greatly in favour of the RAF as RAF Bomber Command gained in strength.

British bombing by day resulted in too many losses and too few results; as a result the British operated by night while building up their strategic force with larger bombers. By 1942, Bomber Command could put 1,000 bombers over one German city.

During the beginning raids of Operation Barbarossa the Luftwaffe wiped out the majority of the Soviet air forces. The Soviets would only regain their air wing later in the war with the help of the United States.

From 1942 onwards, the efforts of Bomber Command were supplemented by the Eighth Air Force of the United States Army Air Forces, U.S. Army Air Forces units being deployed to England to join the assault on mainland Europe on 4 July 1942. Bomber Command raided by night and the US forces by day. The "Operation Gomorrah" raids on Hamburg (24 July 1943 – 29 July 1943) caused a firestorm leading to massive destruction and loss of life.

On 14 February 1945, a raid on Dresden produced one of the most devastating fires in history. A firestorm was created in the city, and between 18,000 and 25,000 people were killed. Only the Hamburg attack, the 9–10 March 1945 firebombing of Tokyo and the nuclear attacks on Hiroshima (6 August 1945) and Nagasaki (9 August 1945) killed more people through a single attack.

Mediterranean and other European countries

The Mediterranean and Middle East theatre was a major theatre of operations during the Second World War. The vast size of this theatre included the fighting between the Allies and Axis in Italy, the Balkans, Southern Europe, Malta, North Africa and the Middle East.

Prior to the war Italy had invaded Albania and officially annexed it. Mussolini's regime declared war on Britain and France on 10 June 1940, and invaded Greece on 28 October. However, Italian forces were unable to match the Nazi successes in northwest Europe; in fact, it was not until German intervention that Greece was overrun by the Axis powers. While the Greek campaign was underway, German forces, supported by the Italians, Hungarians and the Bulgarians simultaneously invaded Yugoslavia. After the mainland was conquered, Germany invaded Crete in what is known as the Battle of Crete. With the Balkans secure, Germany and its allies attacked the Soviet Union in the largest land operation in history. The Balkans campaign delayed this invasion, and subsequent resistance movements in Albania, Yugoslavia and Greece tied up valuable Axis forces. This provided much needed and possibly decisive relief for the Soviets. 

Fighting in Southern Europe did not resume until Axis forces were defeated in North Africa. Following the Axis defeat in Africa, Allied forces invaded Italy and during a prolonged campaign fought their way north through Italy. The invasion of Italy resulted in the nation switching sides to the Allies and the ousting of Mussolini. But, in spite of this coup, Fascists and occupying German forces retained possession of the northern half of Italy. In the northern part of Italy, the occupying Germans installed Mussolini as the head of the new fascist republican government, the Italian Social Republic or RSI to show that the Axis forces were still in power there and a force to be dealt with. But Mussolini and his Fascists were now puppet rulers under their German patrons.

On the opposite side of the Adriatic Sea the Allied (and mostly pro-Soviet) National Liberation Army of Yugoslavia, which got some supplies and assistance from Western Allies, battled the Axis powers. In late 1944 it was joined by the advancing Soviet Army and proceeded to push the remaining German forces out of the Balkans.

By April 1945, German forces were retreating on all fronts in northern Italy and occupied Yugoslavia, following continuous Allied attacks. The campaign and the fighting in the Mediterranean and Middle East theatre came to an end on 29 April. On 2 May in Italy, Field Marshal Heinrich von Vietinghoff, the commander-in-chief of all German forces in the country surrendered to Field Marshal Harold Alexander, the supreme commander of all Allied forces in the Mediterranean area. However, in a preview of the Cold War fighting continued in Greece where a civil war broke out and lasted until the end of 1949 when Greek government troops, aided by the US and Britain, defeated the communist guerrillas supported by Marshal Tito and USSR.

Eastern Front

Initial Soviet retreat

On 22 June 1941, Germany launched the invasion of the Soviet Union, code-named Operation Barbarossa. This invasion, the biggest in recorded history, started the bloodiest conflict in world history; the Axis–Soviet War, also known as the Eastern Front.
It is generally accepted as being the most lethal conflict in human history, with over 30 million dead as a result. It involved more land combat than all other World War II theatres combined.

On the very night of the invasion Soviet troops received a directive undersigned by Marshal Timoshenko and General of the Army Georgi Zhukov that commanded: "do not answer to any provocations" and "do not undertake any actions without specific orders". The early weeks of the invasion were devastating for the Soviet Army. Enormous numbers of Soviet troops were encircled in pockets and fell into Nazi German hands. In addition to German troops, Italian, Hungarian, Romanian and Finnish troops were also involved in the campaign. Finland initially declared neutrality; however, with both German and Soviet troops on her soil, Finland was prepared to join forces with Germany when the Soviet Union attacked Finland on 25 June. The following conflict from 1941 to 1944 is sometimes referred to as the Continuation War, as in the continuation of the Winter War. Spain, under the fascist dictator Francisco Franco, immediately offered military assistance to the Axis effort by sending volunteers known as the Blue Division to the Eastern front.

Operation Barbarossa suffered from several fundamental flaws. The most serious of these was the logistical situation of the attack. The sheer vastness of the distances in the Soviet Union meant that Germany could only advance so far before outrunning their supply chains. By the time the German attack froze to a halt before the city of Moscow on 5 December 1941, it literally could not go any further. There simply were not enough supplies reaching the front to conduct proper defensive operations, let alone a proper offense. A crucial mistake on the part of Germany was that the timetable for Barbarossa was planned with the assumption that the Soviets would collapse before the onset of winter.

During their long retreat, the Soviets employed a scorched earth policy. They burned crops and destroyed utilities as they withdrew before Germany's advance,  which contributed to the logistical problems that Germany experienced. More importantly for them, the Soviets also succeeded in a massive and unprecedented removal of their industrial resources from the threatened war zone to protected areas further east.

The extension of the campaign beyond the length that Germany expected meant that the German Army suffered hundreds of thousands of casualties in winter conditions and from the counterattacks of Soviet units.

Even with their advance having ground to a halt due to a lack of supplies and the onset of winter, Germany had conquered a vast amount of territory, including two-fifths of the Soviet economy. Dislodging them proved difficult and eventually cost the Soviet Union dearly.

A few months after the invasion began, German troops came to southern approaches to Leningrad and laid siege to the city (known as the Siege of Leningrad), which was also blocked from the north by Finnish forces. Finland's C-in-C Mannerheim had halted at the River Svir and refrained from attacking the city. Hitler had ordered that the city of Leningrad must "vanish from the surface of the earth", with its entire population exterminated. Rather than storming the city, the Wehrmacht was ordered to blockade Leningrad so as to starve the city to death, while attacking it with bombers and artillery. About one million civilians died in the Leningrad siege – 800,000 by starvation. The siege lasted for 872 days. The only overland way into the city was possible during the winter, across the frozen Lake Ladoga, between the German and Finnish lines.

Summer campaign of 1942 and Stalingrad
 

After enduring the Russian winter of 1941–1942, the German army prepared for further offensive operations. One of the major problems faced by the Nazi war machine in World War II was a shortage of oil. For this reason, Germany decided to give up on capturing Moscow for the time being, and the summer offensive of 1942 decided to focus on the war in the south of the USSR, with the target being the oil fields of the Caucasus. Meanwhile, the Soviets had their own plans.

The beginning of the Soviet campaign turned into a strategic disaster when its Southern flank was nearly destroyed. Surviving Soviet units were pushed hundreds of kilometres to the east and the Wehrmacht advance went almost uncontested. But in a major blunder, Hitler split Army Group South into two subgroups, Army Group A which would attack the Caucasus and Army Group B which would advance towards the city of Stalingrad (now Volgograd).

Indecision by Hitler, dissent among the higher-ranked Nazi German officers, and over-extended supply lines contributed to the eventual defeat and withdrawal of the Axis military in the prolonged battle in the streets of Stalingrad. Germany had occupied over 90% of the city, but in an attempt to defeat the remaining Soviet defenders almost all German soldiers in the area were funneled into the ruins of the city. Months of bitter hand-to-hand combat in the ruins of the city depleted the German forces, leaving only Romanian and Hungarian forces to guard the flanks of the Stalingrad army group. In Operation Uranus, the Soviets defeated these Axis forces as they performed a massive encirclement operation. The Axis troops remaining in the city were trapped – cut off from their supply lines and starving, amidst a harsh winter - were ordered by Hitler to fight to the last man.

Starved of food, fuel, ammunition, and clothes, the pocket was gradually reduced, with the last portion surrendering on 2 February 1943. In a cynical attempt to prevent the surrender, Hitler promoted Friedrich Paulus, commander of the 6th Army to Field Marshal because no German of that rank had surrendered before. Heavy losses affected both sides in the Battle of Stalingrad, one of the most costly battles in history. About 1.5 million people perished in this battle, including 100,000 civilians in the city.

Battles after Stalingrad
After Stalingrad, the initiative had passed from Germany but had not yet been seized by the Soviets. A desperate counterattack in the spring of 1943 by forces of Field Marshal Erich von Manstein temporarily halted the Soviet advance. The Battle of Kursk was the last major offensive by the German Army on the eastern front. The Soviets had intelligence of what was to come and prepared massive defenses in huge depth in the Kursk salient. After Kursk, the Red Army got the upper hand and generally was on the offensive for the rest of the war. The large scale of the Soviet Union allowed it to overcome high losses in manpower and equipment. The Soviet success prompted a more successful Allied initiative on the Western Front of Europe because Nazi Germany was bogged down in a costly defensive war on the East, defending its ever-shrinking occupied territory.

Pushing the enemy out of the Soviet territory in June 1944 by conducting the large-scale Operation Bagration, the Soviet Army proceeded to dismantle the Eastern Axis powers — Romania, Bulgaria, and Hungary — to liberate other neighboring countries from the German Army, and to impose Communist-led governments on the "liberated" nations. Some of these nations joined the Allies and provided troops to fight Nazi Germany, which was effectively the only remaining Axis power in Europe by the end of 1944. Finland retained its independence the second time, but broke with the Axis, at the cost of having to fight its former ally and ceding more territory to the USSR.

By February 1945, the Soviets brought the war to the German heartland, finally ending with the capture of Berlin by the Red Army. The end of the war in Europe left the Soviet Union in control over large areas of Central and Southeastern Europe, in addition to its 1941 conquests in Eastern Europe.

Effects of the Eastern Front

More Soviet citizens died during World War II than those of all other European countries combined. Nazi ideology considered Slavs to be "subhuman" and German forces committed ethnically targeted mass murder. Civilians were rounded up and burned alive or shot in squads in many cities conquered by the Nazis. At least 27 million civilians and military personnel perished during the war.

8 million Red Army troops died facing the Germans and their allies on the Eastern Front. The Axis forces themselves had lost over 6 million troops, whether by combat or by wounds, disease, starvation or exposure; many others were seized as POW, about 10% of them died in the rear 

Lend-Lease supplies from the United Kingdom and the United States had a very important impact on Soviet military forces. Supply convoys sailed to Soviet ports that were patrolled by Nazi U-boats. Allied activities before D-Day may have tied up only a few divisions in actual fighting, but many more were forced to guard lonely coasts against raids that never came or to man anti-aircraft guns throughout Nazi-controlled Europe.

Allied invasion of occupied France

Simultaneously with the fall of Rome came the long-awaited invasion of France. Operation Overlord put over 180,000 troops ashore in Normandy on 6 June 1944, creating a beachhead that would eventually result in over 3 million Allied soldiers on Germany's western front. A long grinding campaign six weeks long followed as American, British, and Canadian forces were slowly built up in the beachhead, and German forces slowly worn down. When the breakout finally did come it was spectacular, with Allied troops very quickly capturing almost all of Normandy within days. Many German forces that had been fighting in Normandy were trapped in the Falaise pocket.

Incessant bombing of Germany's infrastructure and cities caused tremendous casualties and disruption. Internally, Hitler survived a number of Nazi inner assassination attempts. The most serious was the 20 July 1944 plot. Orchestrated by Claus von Stauffenberg and involving among others Erwin Rommel and Alfred Delp, the plot had intended to place a time bomb in a position to kill Hitler but a number of unscheduled factors and operation failures led to its failure. Adolf Hitler was only slightly injured.

Operation Overlord was complemented by an invasion of southern France on 15 August 1944, codenamed Operation Dragoon. By September 1944 three Allied Army Groups were in line against German formations in the west. There was optimism that the war in Europe might be over by the end of 1944.

An attempt was made to force the situation with Operation Market Garden (17 September 1944 – 25 September 1944). The Allies attempted to capture bridges with an airborne assault, to open the way into Germany and liberate the northern Netherlands. Since heavier German forces than intelligence had predicted were present, the British 1st Airborne Division was almost completely destroyed, and the operation failed.

The weather of 1944 combined with a poor situation for the Allies led to a stagnant situation on the western front. The Americans continued to grind away at the defenders in the Battle of Hurtgen Forest (19 September 1944 – 10 February 1945). As long as Germany stayed on the defense, the Allies were hard-pressed to advance rapidly.

That changed when Germany mounted a major counteroffensive on 16 December 1944. The Ardennes offensive, also called the Battle of the Bulge, drove back and surrounded some small American units. The Allied forces were eventually successful in driving back Germany, in what turned out to be their last major advance of the war. The battle officially ended on 27 January 1945.

The final obstacle to the Allies was the Rhine. It was crossed in March 1945, and the way lay open to the center of Germany. The last major German forces in the west were encircled and trapped in the Ruhr.

End of the war in Europe

On 27 April 1945, as Allied forces closed in on Milan, Mussolini was captured by Italian Partisans. He was trying to flee Italy to Switzerland and was traveling with a German anti-air battalion. On 28 April, Mussolini and several of the other Fascists captured with him were taken to Dongo and executed by firing squad. The bodies were then taken to Milan and unceremoniously strung up in front of a filling station.

Hitler, learning of Mussolini's death, realized that the end had finally come. He remained in Berlin, the crumbling Nazi capital, even as the city was encircled and trapped by the Soviets and the Battle of Berlin raged. On 30 April, Adolf Hitler, with his wife of one day, Eva Braun, committed suicide in his bunker to avoid capture by Soviet troops. In his last will and testament, Hitler appointed Grand Admiral Karl Dönitz as the new German leader. But Germany lasted only 7 days longer under the "Flensburg government" of Dönitz. He surrendered unconditionally to the Allies on 8 May 1945, but German forces continued to fight elsewhere in territories still occupied by Germany until 11 May, 1945. 

On 5 June 1945, the Allies signed the Berlin Declaration, which formally took over the supreme authority of Germany and declared Germany's unconditional surrender, bringing about the end of Nazi Germany.

See also

 European–African–Middle Eastern Campaign Medal
 Mediterranean and Middle East theatre of World War II
 Pacific War

Footnotes

References

Citations

Works cited

Further reading

  6 volumes, 1948–1953
 
 
 
 
 
 

 
Theaters and campaigns of World War II